Jesse Aungles (born 8 June 1995) is an Australian Paralympic swimmer. He represented  Australia at the 2016 Summer Paralympics and the 2020 Summer Paralympics

Personal
He was born on 8 June in 1995 in Adelaide, South Australia. Aungles right leg was malformed at birth, which meant one femur was 10% shorter than the other and finished at the knee and his left leg was missing the fibula bone, the ankle, and he had only one toe on the foot. His left foot was amputated and his hip reconstructed at age one. He attended Unley High School.  He has been studying a Bachelor of International Relations, Politics and Commerce at the University of Canberra since 2014.

Career
His first swimming competition was at the age of nine. Aungles stated: "I didn't consider myself as having a disability until I was about 10 because I was born that way. But as I got older I could tell people saw me a bit differently and being able to swim has been a way to overcome some of that". Aungles has been inspired by local swimmer and one of Australia's greatest Paralympians Matt Cowdrey.

In April 2014, Aungles won the men's 200 m individual medley SM8 event at the 2014 Australian Swimming Championships in a time of 2:29.54 to qualify for the 2014 Commonwealth Games. Three months later in Glasgow, Aungles won silver in the 200 metre individual medley SM8 event finishing behind the 2012 Olympic champion, England's Oliver Hynd.

At the 2014 Pan Pacific Para Swimming Championships in California, Aungles won two gold, two silver a bronze medal. In the 100 metre butterfly S8, Aungles won gold in 1:05.48. In the 200 m medley SM8, Aungles started strong but was swam down by fellow countryman Blake Cochrane who just out touched Aungles by 0.24 seconds. His bronze came in the 400 metre freestyle S8. In the relays, Aungles with Michael Anderson, Rick Pendleton and Matt Levy won gold in 4 × 100 metre medley finishing over six seconds ahead of the United States and in the 4×50 m medley the team of Aungles, Matthew Haanappel, Ahmed Kelly and Grant Patterson finished second behind Brazil.

At the 2015 IPC Swimming World Championships, Glasgow, Scotland, he finished fourth in the Men's 4 × 100 m Medley Relay 34pts, fifth in the Men's 200m Individual Medley SM8, sixth in the Men's 400m Freestyle S8 and Men's 100m Backstroke S8 and seventh in Men's 100m Butterfly S8.

In 2016, he is training at the National Swimming Centre at the Australian Institute of Sport with coach Yuriy Vdovychenko. He is a South Australian Sports Institute scholarship holder. Aungles represented Australia at the 2016 Rio Paralympics in four different events. He placed eighth in the final of Men's 400m Freestyle S8, seventh in Men's 100m Butterfly S8, seventh in Men's 100m Backstroke and sixth in Men's 200m Individual Medley SM8.

In reflection on competing for Rio, Aungles stated "Getting picked for that team is definitely a confidence boost. I was doubting myself after London trials when I didn't make the podium."

At the 2018 Commonwealth Games, Gold Coast, he won the gold medal in the Men's 200m Individual Medley SM8.

At the 2019 World Para Swimming Championships, London, he won the silver medal in the Men's 100m Backstroke S8 and bronze medal in the Men's 200m Individual Medal SM8.

At the 2020 Tokyo Paralympics, Aungles competed in four events. He came 11th in the 100 m butterfly S8 in his Heat and failed to advance to the Final. He qualified for the 200 m individual medley SM8 Final and came seventh with a time of 2:29.48. His best results were in the Men's 100 m Backstroke S8 (time of 1:07.94) and in the Men's 100 m Breaststroke SB7. (time of 1:22.06)  He came fourth in both events.

Recognition 

 2017 - inducted into Swimming South Australia Hall of Fame.
 2019 - Swimming Australia Hancock Prospecting Swimmers’ Swimmer Award.

References

External links
 
 
 

1995 births
Commonwealth Games gold medallists for Australia
Commonwealth Games medallists in swimming
Commonwealth Games silver medallists for Australia
Living people
Male Paralympic swimmers of Australia
S8-classified Paralympic swimmers
Sportspeople from Adelaide
Swimmers at the 2014 Commonwealth Games
Swimmers at the 2016 Summer Paralympics
Swimmers at the 2018 Commonwealth Games
Swimmers at the 2020 Summer Paralympics
Medalists at the World Para Swimming Championships
Australian male freestyle swimmers
Australian male backstroke swimmers
Australian male breaststroke swimmers
Australian male butterfly swimmers
Australian male medley swimmers
21st-century Australian people
Medallists at the 2014 Commonwealth Games
Medallists at the 2018 Commonwealth Games